Paolo Giuseppe Pantano (born 23 February 1982), known professionally as Paul Pantano, is an Australian actor.

Early life
The son of Italian parents, Pantano was born and raised in the Sydney suburb of Glebe. He attended De La Salle College Ashfield.

Career
Pantano received his first role appearing on the series Police Rescue, followed by a guest appearance in police drama series Water Rats. Pantano appeared in the series again in 1998. This performance earned him the Young Actor's Award at the 40th Australian Film Institute Awards. He received his first leading role that same year when he was cast as Marcello Di Campili in the children's television series Crash Zone, playing the character for two seasons until 2001. That same year, he was cast as Jack Scully in Neighbours. When the character was reintroduced the following year, actor Jay Ryan took over the role.

Pantano's other leading roles where in the critically acclaimed FOX8 drama series Dangerous, Breakers, and miniseries Marking Time. Pantano has also appeared in many recurring roles on popular series, including Close Contact, Wildside, Stingers, Blue Heelers, All Saints, the television mini-series The Pacific, and Home and Away as Elliot Gillen.

Pantano received his first film role in 1995 having a part in Mighty Morphin Power Rangers: The Movie. He has also appeared in the films Son of the Mask and Stealth. He had a leading role in Australian boxing film Two Fists, One Heart. In 2013, Pantano was cast in Sam Fox: Extreme Adventures as Miguel. He also appeared in short film Melvis, and web series The Army within''.

Filmography

References

External links
 

1982 births
Australian people of Italian descent
Australian male television actors
Australian male child actors
Australian male film actors
Living people